The 2021 Mongolian protests was mass demonstrations and a nationwide strike that culminated into the fall of the prime minister Ukhnaagiin Khürelsükh after demonstrators took to the streets in their thousands, protesting the government's response to the COVID-19 pandemic in Mongolia between 20 and 22 January 2021. Protesters demanded the fall of the government and president over the failure to contain the case rise despite 1584 cases and 3 deaths.

See also
 2018-2019 Mongolian protests

References

2021 in Mongolia
2021 protests
Protests in Mongolia
Protests over responses to the COVID-19 pandemic